Khansar County is in Isfahan province, Iran. The capital of the county is the city of Khansar. At the 2006 census, the county's population was 31,542 in 9,394 households. The following census in 2011 counted 32,423 people in 10,186 households. At the 2016 census, the county's population was 33,049 in 10,923 households.

Administrative divisions

The population history and structural changes of Khansar County's administrative divisions over three consecutive censuses are shown in the following table. The latest census shows one district, three rural districts, and one cities.

References

 

Counties of Isfahan Province